Frederik Jacobus Johannes Buytendijk (April 19, 1887 in Breda – October 21, 1974 in Nijmegen) was a Dutch anthropologist, biologist and psychologist.

He graduated as a physician, was a lecturer in biology and general physiology at the VU University Amsterdam and received a chair in physiology there in 1919. In 1924 he became professor of physiology and histology in Groningen. From 1946 until his retirement in 1957, he was an extraordinary professor in Nijmegen and professor of psychology in Utrecht, although he had never studied psychology. [1]

In his younger years, acquaintance with Max Scheler, Hans Driesch and Helmuth Plessner (with whom he became friends) had a considerable influence on Buytendijk. He corresponded with many great philosophers, such as Binswanger, Guardini, Merleau-Ponty and with Sartre and Simone de Beauvoir. [2] Frederik (Frits) Buytendijk got his inspiration and method from different sources: the experiences he had since 1918 as an animal psychologist, and after the Second World War as a human psychologist, and from phenomenology, the doctrine that makes the phenomena speak for themselves. In his General Theory of Human Posture and Movement (1949), Buytendijk succeeded in emphasizing a combination of body and mind.

In 1937 the originally reformed Buytendijk became a Catholic. He was, among other things, chairman of the Catholic Association for Mental Health and from the end of the 1950s he was editor-in-chief of the Aula series, the popular scientific paperback series of publishing house Het Spectrum. He has published numerous books and articles, such as De Vrouw in 1951.

1887 births
1974 deaths
Dutch anthropologists
Dutch biologists
Dutch psychologists
People from Breda
20th-century anthropologists
20th-century psychologists
20th-century biologists